Karl Groom is a British guitarist and record producer. He is best known as a founding and the only constant member of the progressive metal band Threshold. His production and mixing credits are mainly with progressive and power metal bands.

Musician
Groom is the guitarist of Threshold, having formed the band in 1988. He has since produced and released eleven studio albums and is currently signed to Nuclear Blast. In addition, a live DVD entitled Critical Energy was released in 2004 whilst on the Inside Out Music label. Groom also played guitar in Mercy Train, Shadowland, and Strangers on a Train, all during the mid-1990s. In 2017, he played all acoustic guitars on Galahad's Quiet Storms album.

Producer
Groom works from his own Thin Ice Studios since 1990. The recording facility was originally located in Berkshire, but moved to Surrey in 1995. He is mostly known for metal styles of production such as Threshold and DragonForce, but has also worked on progressive acts including Yes, Pendragon, Galahad, Ulysses, and John Wetton. The Strangers on a Train albums were rereleased in 2012 on the Polish Metal Mind Label.

Strangers on a Train - The Key Part I: The Prophecy (1990) p/e/m
Threshold – Wounded Land (1993) p/e/m
Pendragon – The Window of Life (1993) e
Strangers on a Train - The Key Part II: The Labyrinth (1993) p/e/m
Ulysses - Neronia (1993) p/e/m
Threshold – Psychedelicatessen (1994) p/e/m
Pendragon – Utrecht... The Final Frontier (1995) p/e/m
Pendragon – 'The Masquerade Overture (1996) p/e/m
Threshold – Extinct Instinct (1997) p/e/m
Pendragon – Utrecht... The Final Frontier (1995) p/e/m
Pendragon – Live In Kraków 1996 (1997)
Threshold – Clone (1998) p/e/m
DragonForce - Valley of the Damned (2003) p/e/m
Threshold – Decadent (1999) p/e/m
Threshold – Hypothetical (2001) p/e/m
Pendragon – Not of This World (2001) p/e/m
Threshold – Critical Mass (2002) p/e/m
Threshold – Concert in Paris (2002) p/e/m
Threshold – Wireless (2003) p/e/m
Threshold – Subsurface (2004) p/e/m
DragonForce - Sonic Firestorm (2004) p/e/m
Threshold – Replica (2004) p/e/m
Threshold – Critical Energy (2004) p/e/m
Pendragon – Believe (2005) p/e/m
DragonForce - Inhuman Rampage (2006) p/e/m
Threshold – Surface to Stage (2006) p/e/m
Edenbridge – The Grand Design (2006) e/m/g
Threshold – Dead Reckoning (2007) p/e/m
Threshold – The Ravages of Time (2007) p/e/m
Edenbridge – MyEarthDream (2008) e/m/g
Trigger the Bloodshed - Purgation (2008) m
DragonForce -Ultra Beatdown (2008) p/e/m
Pendragon – Pure (2008) p/e/m
Clive Nolan – She (2008) e/m
Trigger the Bloodshed - The Great Depression (2009) m
Threshold – Paradox: The Singles Collection (2009) p/e/m
Pendragon – Concerto Maximo (2009) p/e/m
Edenbridge – Solitaire (2010) e/m
Yes – In the Present - Live from Lyon (2011) e/m
Pendragon – Passion (2011)
DragonForce - The Power Within (2012) p/e/m
Clive Nolan – Alchemy (2012) e/m
Threshold – March of Progress (2012) p/e/m
Edenbridge – The Bonding (2013) e/m
Clive Nolan – Alchemy DVD Live (2013) e/m
NightMare World - In The Fullness Of Time (2015) p/e/m
Threshold - Legends of The Shires (2017) p/e/m

p – produced,  e – engineered, m – mixed, g – guest musician

References

External links
www.thresh.net

Year of birth missing (living people)
Living people
English heavy metal guitarists
Progressive metal guitarists
Threshold (band) members